Yoshihisa Yamamoto (born July 4, 1970 in present-day Kudamatsu) is a Japanese mixed martial artist and professional wrestler. A professional MMA competitor from 1995 until 2012, he competed for RINGS, WEF, PRIDE, Vale Tudo Japan, DEEP, and K-1 HERO'S.

Mixed martial arts career

Fighting Network RINGS
A high school judoka, Yamamoto made his professional debut on the then puroresu promotion Fighting Network RINGS in 1991 against Masayuki Naruse, who was also making his debut. When the company turned to mixed martial arts, he had his first fight on January 25, 1995, facing off another debutant, Dutch fighter Hans Nijman. Yamamoto lost the bout when he was knocked out only 43 seconds into the fight. After winning his next bout for via unanimous decision at an event in Amsterdam for the organization, Yamamoto faced off against legendary Brazilian jiu-jitsu specialist, Rickson Gracie at Vale Tudo Japan 1995. Yamamoto gave the undefeated fighter arguably the most difficult fight of his career, but the former professional wrestler ultimately lost via rear-naked choke at 3:49 of the third round, the referee having stepped in when Yamamoto refused to tap out. This would be the only fight that Gracie ever had that didn't end with him winning in the first round.

The fight with Gracie elevated Yamamoto's status. In his next bout, he won via neck crank submission before losing via keylock submission to his teacher Akira Maeda and then to Ricardo Morais, who knocked out Yamamoto 46 seconds into the fight. In his next bout, Yamamoto faced David Khakhaleishvili, an Olympic Gold Medalist in judo. Yamamoto defeated the Georgia fighter via TKO 40 seconds into the fight before competing in the Rings - Battle Dimensions Tournament 1996 Final. Yamamoto won his fight in the quarter-finals of the tournament and then lost in his semi-finals match against Kiyoshi Tamura.

Yamamoto then went 7-7-1 in his next 15 fights with wins over Valentijn Overeem, Joop Kasteel, and Tsuyoshi Kosaka before being invited to compete in PRIDE.

PRIDE
Yamamoto made his PRIDE debut at Pride 16 on September 24, 2001 against Brazilian Assuerio Silva and was dominated, losing via only 11 seconds into the fight via TKO. However, the former professional wrestler would bounce back, defeating South African kickboxer Jan Nortje via armbar submission less than two minutes into the fight. In his next bouts he was knocked out by former NFL lineman Bob Sapp and then lost via unanimous decision to Guy Mezger before picking up his next win against Alexander Otsuka after Otsuka injured his leg in the second round. In his next bout at Pride Final Conflict 2003 Yamamoto fought Heath Herring and performed well against the Sambo and Muay Thai specialist but ultimately lost via rear-naked choke submission in the third round.

In his next bout the 13-16-1 Yamamoto faced two-time UFC Heavyweight Tournament Champion, Mark Kerr. Early in the fight, Kerr attempted and secured a double leg takedown, but spiked his head into the canvas in the process, stunning him and allowing Yamamoto to capitalize with ground and pound, winning the fight via TKO at 0:40 of the first round.

Yamamoto's next appearance for the organization was at Pride Bushido 2 against future 2006 Pride World Grand Prix Champion Mirko Cro Cop. Yamamoto lost the bout via TKO 2:12 into the first round. Yamamoto fought once more the organization at Pride Bushido 3 against Choi Mu-Bae and lost via unanimous decision.

Post-PRIDE
After PRIDE, Yamamoto fought for K-1 Hero's, and DEEP, but has not won since his TKO win over Mark Kerr, losing his last nine fights.

Mixed martial arts record

|-
| Loss
| align=center| 15–26–1
| Jong Wang Kim
| KO (punches)
| Grabaka: Grabaka Live! 2
| 
| align=center| 1
| align=center| 0:15
| Tokyo, Japan
|Heavyweight bout.
|-
| Loss
| align=center| 15–25–1
| Keiichiro Yamamiya
| Decision (unanimous)
| Grabaka Live: 1st Cage Attack
| 
| align=center| 2
| align=center| 5:00
| Tokyo, Japan
| 
|-
| Loss
| align=center| 15–24–1
| Hidetaka Monma
| Submission (arm-triangle choke)
| DEEP: 50th Impact
| 
| align=center| 1
| align=center| 1:07
| Tokyo, Japan
|Welterweight debut.
|-
| Loss
| align=center| 15–23–1
| Lee Tae-Hyun
| TKO (punches)
| HERO'S 2007 in Korea
| 
| align=center| 1
| align=center| 1:03
| Seoul, South Korea
|Open Weight bout.
|-
| Loss
| align=center| 15–22–1
| Katsuyori Shibata
| TKO (punches)
| HERO'S 8
| 
| align=center| 1
| align=center| 0:09
| Nagoya, Japan
| 
|-
| Loss
| align=center| 15–21–1
| Don Frye
| Submission (rear-naked choke)
| HERO'S 6
| 
| align=center| 1
| align=center| 4:52
| Tokyo, Japan
| 
|-
| Loss
| align=center| 15–20–1
| Kim Min-Soo
| Submission (rear-naked choke)
| HERO'S 4
| 
| align=center| 2
| align=center| 1:32
| Tokyo, Japan
| 
|-
| Loss
| align=center| 15–19–1
| Choi Mu-Bae
| Decision (unanimous)
| PRIDE Bushido 3
| 
| align=center| 2
| align=center| 5:00
| Yokohama, Japan
| 
|-
| Loss
| align=center| 15–18–1
| Mirko Cro Cop
| TKO (punches)
| PRIDE Bushido 2
| 
| align=center| 1
| align=center| 2:12
| Yokohama, Japan
| 
|-
| Win
| align=center| 15–17–1
| Mark Kerr
| TKO (punches)
| PRIDE 27
| 
| align=center| 1
| align=center| 0:40
| Osaka, Japan
| 
|-
| Loss
| align=center| 14–17–1
| Heath Herring
| Submission (rear-naked choke)
| PRIDE Final Conflict 2003
| 
| align=center| 3
| align=center| 2:29
| Tokyo, Japan
| 
|-
| Win
| align=center| 14–16–1
| Alexander Otsuka
| TKO (leg injury)
| PRIDE 24
| 
| align=center| 2
| align=center| 5:00
| Fukuoka, Japan
| 
|-
| Loss
| align=center| 13–16–1
| Guy Mezger
| Decision (unanimous)
| PRIDE 22
| 
| align=center| 3
| align=center| 5:00
| Nagoya, Japan
| 
|-
| Loss
| align=center| 13–15–1
| Bob Sapp
| KO (punches)
| PRIDE 20
| 
| align=center| 1
| align=center| 2:44
| Yokohama, Japan
| 
|-
| Win
| align=center| 13–14–1
| Jan Nortje
| Submission (armbar)
| PRIDE 18
| 
| align=center| 1
| align=center| 1:43
| Fukuoka, Japan
| 
|-
| Loss
| align=center| 12–14–1
| Assuerio Silva
| TKO (punches)
| PRIDE 16
| 
| align=center| 1
| align=center| 0:11
| Osaka, Japan
| 
|-
| Loss
| align=center| 12–13–1
| Valentijn Overeem
| Submission (armbar)
| RINGS: King of Kings 2000 Final
| 
| align=center| 1
| align=center| 0:45
| Tokyo, Japan
| 
|-
| Win
| align=center| 12–12–1
| Chris Haseman
| TKO (strikes)
| RINGS: King of Kings 2000 Block B
| 
| align=center| 1
| align=center| 3:51
| Osaka, Japan
| 
|-
| Win
| align=center| 11–12–1
| Ameran Bitsadze
| Submission (armbar)
| RINGS: King of Kings 2000 Block B
| 
| align=center| 1
| align=center| 3:49
| Osaka, Japan
| 
|-
| Loss
| align=center| 10–12–1
| Semmy Schilt
| KO (knee and punch)
| RINGS Holland: Di Capo Di Tutti Capi
| 
| align=center| 1
| align=center| 2:54
| Utrecht, Netherlands
| 
|-
| Loss
| align=center| 10–11–1
| Branden Lee Hinkle
| Submission (rear-naked choke)
| World Extreme Fighting 9: World Class
| 
| align=center| 1
| align=center| 2:21
| Evansville, Indiana, USA
| 
|-
| Loss
| align=center| 10–10–1
| Jeremy Horn
| Submission (arm-triangle choke)
| RINGS: Millennium Combine 1
| 
| align=center| 2
| align=center| 2:50
| Tokyo, Japan
| 
|-
| Loss
| align=center| 10–9–1
| Brad Kohler
| Submission (smother choke)
| RINGS: King of Kings 1999 Block A
| 
| align=center| 1
| align=center| 1:57
| Tokyo, Japan
| 
|-
| Draw
| align=center| 10–8–1
| Kiyoshi Tamura
| Draw
| RINGS: Rise 4th
| 
| align=center| 3
| align=center| 5:00
| Japan
| 
|-
| Win
| align=center| 10–8
| Tsuyoshi Kosaka
| TKO (palm strikes)
| RINGS: Rise 3rd
| 
| align=center| 3
| align=center| 0:41
| Japan
| 
|-
| Win
| align=center| 9–8
| Joop Kasteel
| TKO (palm strikes)
| RINGS: Rise 2nd
| 
| align=center| 1
| align=center| 7:32
| Japan
| 
|-
| Win
| align=center| 8–8
| Valentijn Overeem
| Submission (armbar)
| RINGS: Rise 1st
| 
| align=center| 1
| align=center| 2:40
| Japan
| 
|-
| Win
| align=center| 7–8
| Andrei Kopylov
| Submission
| RINGS: Final Capture
| 
| align=center| 1
| align=center| 6:55
| Japan
| 
|-
| Win
| align=center| 6-8
| Mitsuya Nagai
| Submission (armbar)
| RINGS: Extension Fighting 5
| 
| align=center| 1
| align=center| 2:27
| Japan
|
|-
| Win
| align=center| 5–8
| Masayuki Naruse
| Submission (armbar)
| RINGS: Extension Fighting 2
| 
| align=center| 1
| align=center| 21:20
| Japan
| 
|-
| Loss
| align=center| 4–8
| Tariel Bitsadze
| KO (punch)
| RINGS: Budokan Hall 1997
| 
| align=center| 1
| align=center| 0:30
| Tokyo, Japan
| 
|-
| Loss
| align=center| 4–7
| Tariel Bitsadze
| TKO (punches)
| RINGS: Battle Dimensions Tournament 1996 Final
| 
| align=center| 1
| align=center| 3:59
| Japan
| 
|-
| Loss
| align=center| 4–6
| Kiyoshi Tamura
| Submission (neck crank)
| RINGS: Battle Dimensions Tournament 1996 Final
| 
| align=center| 1
| align=center| 2:41
| Tokyo, Japan
| 
|-
| Win
| align=center| 4–5
| Bakouri Gogitidze
| Submission (americana)
| RINGS: Battle Dimensions Tournament 1996 Final
| 
| align=center| 1
| align=center| 1:00
| Tokyo, Japan
| 
|-
| Win
| align=center| 3–5
| David Khakhaleishvili
| TKO (punches)
| RINGS: Battle Dimensions Tournament 1996 Opening Round
| 
| align=center| 1
| align=center| 0:40
| Tokyo, Japan
| 
|-
| Loss
| align=center| 2–5
| Ricardo Morais
| KO (punches)
| RINGS: Maelstrom 6
| 
| align=center| 1
| align=center| 0:46
| Japan
| 
|-
| Loss
| align=center| 2–4
| Akira Maeda
| Submission (americana)
| RINGS: Budokan Hall 1996
| 
| align=center| 1
| align=center| 4:50
| Tokyo, Japan
| 
|-
| Win
| align=center| 2–3
| Ameran Bitsadze
| Submission (neck crank)
| RINGS: Battle Dimensions Tournament 1995 Opening Round
| 
| align=center| 3
| align=center| 1:59
| Japan
| 
|-
| Loss
| align=center| 1–3
| Rickson Gracie
| Technical Submission (rear-naked choke)
| Vale Tudo Japan 1995
| 
| align=center| 3
| align=center| 3:49
| Tokyo, Japan
| 
|-
| Loss
|align=center| 1–2
| Mitsuya Nagai
| Submission (achilles lock)
| RINGS: Rising Series - Yayoi
| 
|align=center| 1
|align=center| 17:18
| Tokyo, Japan
|
|-
| Win
| align=center| 1–1
| Ruud Ewoldt
| Decision (unanimous)
| RINGS Holland: Free Fight
| 
| align=center| 3
| align=center| 5:00
| Amsterdam, Netherlands
| 
|-
| Loss
| align=center| 0–1
| Hans Nijman
| KO (punch)
| RINGS: Budokan Hall 1995
| 
| align=center| 1
| align=center| 0:43
| Tokyo, Japan
|

References

External links
 

1970 births
Living people
Japanese male mixed martial artists
Heavyweight mixed martial artists
Mixed martial artists utilizing judo
Mixed martial artists utilizing wrestling
Japanese male professional wrestlers
Japanese male judoka
Sportspeople from Yamaguchi Prefecture